Samuel Williams Reynolds (August 11, 1890March 20, 1988) was a Republican United States Senator from Nebraska.

Biography
Reynolds was born in Omaha, Nebraska, on August 11, 1890. In 1908, he engaged in the Omaha wholesale coal business.

During World War I, Reynolds served in the United States Army Air Service. He later became a colonel and served as the director of the Army Specialist Corps in Omaha from 1942 to 1943.  He was a delegate to the 1936 Republican National Convention.

In 1954, Reynolds was appointed by Governor Robert B. Crosby to the United States Senate to fill the open seat caused by the death of Hugh Butler.  He declined to run for the office that year and resumed selling coal.  He subsequently became a member of the Omaha City Council from 1957 to 1958.

Reynolds lived in Omaha until his death in 1988. He was interred at Forest Lawn Memorial Park.

References

External links

 

1890 births
1988 deaths
Military personnel from Omaha, Nebraska
Politicians from Omaha, Nebraska
Omaha City Council members
Republican Party United States senators from Nebraska
Nebraska Republicans
United States Army officers
United States Army Air Service pilots of World War I
United States Army personnel of World War II
20th-century American politicians